Annie Lee (born November 7, 1977) is an American actress. During high school she did modeling and appeared in commercials and music videos.  She attended college at UCLA and trained with acting coaches in Hollywood.

As an actress she has appeared in the Rose of Sharon directed by Elliot Hong and the independent film Close Call, which was directed by her father and where she played the lead character.

Lee also began working in production and distribution of entertainment through various producers and film companies. As a filmmaker, Lee produced a short film titled Tomato and Eggs, directed by Shawn Chou, starring Michelle Krusiec, Keiko Agena and Sab Shimono. The film won the Audience Award for Best Asian-American Short Film at the Big Bear Film Festival.

References

External links
 

1977 births
Living people
American film actresses
University of California, Los Angeles alumni
Actresses from Los Angeles
21st-century American women